The University of the Philippines Cebu (also referred to as UPC or UP Cebu) is a public research university and the youngest constituent university of the University of the Philippines System located in Cebu City, the capital city of Cebu province in the Philippines. It was founded on May 3, 1918, ten years after the founding of UP in 1908.

UP Cebu was formerly under the administrative supervision of UP Visayas, along with three other satellite campuses, namely Miag-ao campus, Iloilo City campus and Tacloban College. On September 24, 2010, the UP Board of Regents elevated the status of UP Cebu to that of an autonomous unit, in preparation for its elevation to the status of a constituent university of the UP System in around five to seven years. On October 27, 2016, UP Cebu was elevated to constituent university status.

The college has two campuses. The Lahug campus is located in Gorordo Avenue, Lahug, Cebu City. It occupies a 12-hectare site which was donated by the Cebu Provincial Government in 1929; however, a fraction of the land is occupied by informal settlers. The new UP Cebu SRP campus features the UP Professional Schools which offers degree programs such as Master of Business Administration, Master of Science in Computer Science, Master of Education and Master of Science in Environmental Studies.

In 2007, the Philippines' Commission on Higher Education (CHED) recognized UP Cebu as a National Center of Excellence (COE) in Information Technology.

Name changes

UP Cebu has undergone multiple name changes as a result of its varied history.

 1918: Junior College of Liberal Arts
 1922: Junior College of the Philippines
 1930: Cebu Junior College, UP
 1947: Cebu College, UP
 1963: University of the Philippines Graduate School in Cebu
 1966: University of the Philippines School in Cebu
 1971: Cebu Branch Campus of the University of the Philippines
 1975: University of the Philippines College Cebu
 1987: Cebu College of the University of the Philippines Visayas
 2010: University of the Philippines Cebu College
 2016: University of the Philippines Cebu

Administration

As a constituent university of the UP System, UP Cebu is headed by a Chancellor who serves as the chair of the University Council. Management and handling of the College's various administrative functions are divided between the following offices:

 Office of the Chancellor
 Office of the Vice Chancellor for Academic Affairs (OVCAA)
 Office of the Vice Chancellorfor Administration (OVCA)
 Office of the University Registrar (OUR)
 Office of Student Affairs (OSA)
 Campus Development and Maintenance Office (CDMO)
 Colleges
 College of Communication, Art, and Design
 School of Management 
 College of Science 
 Department of Computer Science 
 College of Social Science 
 UP High School Cebu

See also
 University of the Philippines High School Cebu
 State Universities and Colleges (Philippines)
 List of University of the Philippines people
 University of the Philippines Baguio
 University of the Philippines Manila
 University of the Philippines Los Banos
 University of the Philippines Visayas
 University of the Philippines Mindanao

References

External links
University of the Philippines system
University of the Philippines Cebu

Cebu
State universities and colleges in the Philippines
Universities and colleges in Cebu City
Educational institutions established in 1918
1918 establishments in the Philippines